Paul Booth (born in 1967 in Boonton) is a tattoo artist, sculptor, painter, filmmaker and musician living in New York City. Booth is known for his use of black and gray ink tattoo work depicting dark surrealism styled pieces. He has gained a cult-like following around the world and has had celebrity clientele, which include members of rock bands such as Cheeseburger, Slipknot, Mudvayne, Slayer, Pantera, Soulfly, and Sepultura.

Biography
Booth's artistic passion started when he was just a child. Completely self-taught, he always found comfort in painting darker and more monstrous subject matter. Through his own experimentation and personal growth, Booth has developed a technical style of his own. His utilization of a multi-layer approach, similar to that of the early Flemish painters, allows him to achieve a level of depth and texture that results in a realistic painting. Booth can be best described as a dark surrealist and has exhibited both domestically and internationally.

Booth is perhaps best known for his impact as a tattoo artist. Booth's tattooed celebrities including Gregg Allman, The Undertaker, members of Slayer, Slipknot, Pantera, Lamb of God and others. Rolling Stone Magazine dubbed Booth as "The New King of Rock Tattoos".

In addition to introducing the darker side of art to tattooing, Booth has worked to change the way the public views tattoo art. Booth has been recognized and inducted by the National Arts Club – the oldest and one of the most respected art institutions in the United States. He is the first tattoo artist to receive this honor.

Last Rites Tattoo Theater & Art Gallery
In 1996, Booth opened up Last Rites Tattoo Theatre in New York City. With a collection of well-known tattoo artists from around the world, Last Rites Tattoo Theatre quickly gained a reputation among tattoo connoisseur and became a destination for fans and advocates of Booth's dark work. In 2007, Booth expanded his artistic and professional scope, and opened the first dark art gallery in NYC, aptly named Last Rites Gallery.

The gallery relocated from Hudson Yards to the Garment District in 2015. The new location was Booth's second gallery and was called the Booth Gallery.

Last Rites Tattoo Theater closed its doors in May of 2020, citing economic distress due to the COVID-19 pandemic.

The Art Fusion Experiment
In 2000, Paul Booth co-founded an international charitable art organization called Art Fusion Experiment (AFE). This tattoo-centric art movement focuses its energy on a unique collaborative art concept and demonstrates the strength of the contemporary tattoo artist's ability to work together as a community. This aspect of AFE allows artists to put their egos aside and collaboratively fuse their individual styles to achieve unequalled works of art. It also gives the artist the opportunity to be both a student and a teacher simultaneously. This unique nature of AFE provides artists from around the world a chance to work together to create a single piece.

Filmmaking
In 2007, Booth's directorial debut, The ArtFusion Experiment won Best Feature Documentary at The Newport Beach Film Festival. His second film, the experimental pseudo-documentary Paul Booth's Last Rites: Volume I illustrates his unique artistic vision. The film provides a closer look into the process of Booth's art and the lifestyles that surround him.

References

External links

Living people
American tattoo artists
1968 births
American Theistic Satanists